The International Best Dressed Hall of Fame List was founded by fashionista Eleanor Lambert in 1940 as an attempt to boost the reputation of American fashion at the time. The American magazine Vanity Fair is currently in charge of the List after Lambert left the responsibility to "four friends at Vanity Fair" in 2002, a year before her death.

Other people who have been on the list include:

Women
 Duchess of Alba (Cayetana Fitz-Stuart), socialite, President of the House of Alba Foundation; Seville (2011)
Stacey Bendet, creative director and C.E.O., Alice + Olivia; New York (2014)
 Liliane Bettencourt, (2009)
 Catherine, Duchess of Cambridge; Kensington Palace (2014)
 Misty Copeland, ballerina (2015)
 Catherine Deneuve, actress (2009)
Lauren Hutton, model and actress, New York (2017).
 Sheikha Moza bint Nasser al-Missned of Qatar, Chairperson of the Qatar Foundation for Education, Science and Community Development; UNESCO special envoy for basic and higher education; Doha, Qatar (2015).
 Lauren Santo Domingo (Davis), fashion editor, entrepreneur; New York and Paris (2017).
 Chloë Sevigny, actress; New York (2019).
 Anne Slater, social figure; New York (1991).
 Alexis Smith, actress; New York (1978).
 Mrs. Ray Stark (Fran), socialite, married to the film producer, daughter of Fanny Brice, mother of Vanity Fair contributing editor Wendy Stark; Los Angeles (1988).
 Mrs. Saul Steinberg (Gayfryd), socialite; New York (2000).
 Geraldine Stutz, former president of Henri Bendel; New York (1965).
 Mrs. Martin Summers (Ann), European socialite; London (2000).
 Mrs. T. Suffern Tailer (Jean), socialite; Palm Beach (1980).
 Queen Sirikit of Thailand, Bangkok (1965).
Tilda Swinton, actress, Nairn, Scotland (2016).
 Baroness Thatcher (Margaret Thatcher), former prime minister of the United Kingdom; London (1990).
 Mrs. Lawrence Copley Thaw (Lee), socialite, Sotheby's executive; New York (1990).
 Mrs. Harry Theodoracopulos (Betsy Pickering Kaiser) socialite, Galanos muse, former model; Santa Barbara (1967).
 Mrs. Taki Theodoracopulos (Princess Alexandra Schönberg-Hartenstein); New York and Gstaad (1990).
 Pauline Trigère, fashion designer; New York (1964).
 Tina Turner, singer; Zurich (1996).
 Gloria Vanderbilt, author, artist, fashion designer; New York (1970).
 Adrienne Vittadini, fashion designer; New York (1995).
 Diana Vreeland, former Vogue editor in chief, special consultant to the Metropolitan Museum of Art’s Costume Institute, international fashion guru; New York (1964).
 Mrs. Jerry Wald (Connie), hostess; Beverly Hills (2006).
 Baroness Louise de Waldner, gardener; Provence (1995).
 Baroness Sylvia de Waldner, Brazilian-born socialite; Paris (1986).
 Diana, Princess of Wales, London (1989).
 Faye Wattleton, author, public-policy adviser; New York (1998).
 The Hon. Hilary Weston, former model, former lieutenant governor of Ontario, business executive, author; Toronto (1987).
 Mrs. R. Thornton Wilson Jr. (Josie), socialite, hostess; New York (1985).
 The Duchess of Windsor (Wallis Simpson), married to the former Edward VIII, King of the United Kingdom, Emperor of India, who abdicated to marry her; Paris (1958).
 Lady Amelia Windsor, member of the British royal family (2017).
 Mrs. Norman K. Winston (Rosita), socialite, married to the real-estate mogul; New York (1961).
 Dame Anna Wintour, Vogue editor in chief; New York (1997).
 Mrs. Ann Woodward, socialite, married to banker and sportsman William Woodward Junior; New York (1954).
 Mrs. Charles Wrightsman (Jayne Wrightsman), socialite, collector, museum patron, married to Charles Wrightsman; New York (1965).
 Mrs. Oscar Wyatt Jr. (Lynn), socialite, married to the oilman; Houston (1977).
 Poppy Whale (Pops), international socialite; London (1992).
 Loretta Young, actress, television star; Hollywood (1982).
 Princess Marie Youssoupov, art collector; Lausanne and Paris (1965).
 Renée Zellweger, actress (2009).
 Baroness Thierry Van Zuylen van Nijevelt (Gaby), international socialite; Paris (1978).

Men
 Nicholas Aburn, socialite; New York (1984).

 Dean Acheson, former U.S. secretary of state; Washington, D.C. (1969).
 Gianni Agnelli, Fiat chairman; Turin (1970).
 David Ogilvy, 13th Earl of Airlie, former Lord Chamberlain to the Queen; Angus, Scotland (1972).
 Sir Hardy Amies, fashion designer; London (1974).
 Thomas Ammann, private art dealer; Zurich (1988).
 Prince Pierre d'Arenberg, host; Paris (2001).
 Giorgio Armani, fashion designer; Milan (1981).
 Arthur Ashe, professional tennis player; Richmond, Va. (1984).
 Fred Astaire, dancer, actor; Los Angeles (1968).
 Daniel Baker, cosmetic surgeon; New York (2000).
 Billy Baldwin (decorator); New York (1974).
 Wilkes Bashford, fashion retailer; San Francisco (1983).
 Sir Cecil Beaton, artist, photographer; London (1970).
 David Somerset, 11th Duke of Beaufort, landowner, partner in the Marlborough art gallery; London (1988).
 Jonathan Becker, photographer; New York (2008).
 David Beckham, footballer; Los Angeles (2010)
 John Russell, 13th Duke of Bedford, landowner; London and Santa Fe (1985).
 Harry Belafonte, musician; New York (1972).
 Bijan Pakzad, fashion designer; Beverly Hills (1989).
 Mark Birley, restaurateur, health-club proprietor, men's fragrance designer; London (1988).
 Earl Blackwell, Celebrity Service founder; New York (1980).
 Manolo Blahnik, shoe designer; London (1987).
 Bill Blass, fashion designer; New York (1970).
 Dixon Boardman, financier; New York and Locust Valley (1994).
 Ozwald Boateng, fashion designer; London (2012)
 David Bowie, musician; New York (1998).
 Hamish Bowles, Vogue European editor-at-large; New York (1997).
 Ed Bradley, 60 Minutes correspondent; New York (1997).
 Conte Brando Brandolini d'Adda, vintner; Venice and Paris (1980).
 David Brown, film producer, husband of former Cosmopolitan editor in chief Helen Gurley Brown; New York (1993).
 Gianni Bulgari, jewelry designer; Rome (1975).
 Arpad Busson, financier; London, St. Barth's, and New York (2012)
 Jeffrey Butler, publishing executive; Los Angeles (1978).
 John Cahill, financier; New York (2001).
 Michael Cannon, Town, Country editor-at-large; New York (2001).
 Pierre Cardin, fashion designer; Paris (1970).
 Graydon Carter, Vanity Fair editor; New York (1998).
 Nino Cerruti, fashion designer; Paris (1973).
 Comte Frédéric Chandon de Briailles, head of Moët, Chandon vineyard; Paris (1991).
 Kenneth Chenault, president and C.O.O. of American Express; New York (2000).
 Francesco Clemente, artist; New York and Naples (1996).
 George Clooney, actor, director, writer, producer; Los Angeles and Lake Como, Italy (2007).
 Alistair Cooke, journalist, radio and television personality; London (1984).
 Anderson Cooper, anchor, Anderson Cooper 360°; New York (2007).
 Hernando Courtright, owner of the Beverly Wilshire Hotel; Beverly Hills (1973).
 Madison Cox, landscape designer, author; New York (2000).
 Count Rodolfo Crespi, public-relations executive, socialite; Rome and New York (1970).
 Nicolas de Gunzburg, Editor-in-Chief of Town, Country, fashion editor (1971).
 Phillip Deng; Vienna (2018)
 Angelo Donghia, textile designer; New York (1977).
 Angier Biddle Duke, former U.S. ambassador to El Salvador, Spain, Denmark, and Morocco; New York and Southampton (1969).
 Prince Philip, Duke of Edinburgh, husband of Queen Elizabeth II; London (1969).
 Lapo Elkann, (2009).
 Ahmet Ertegun, co-chairman of the Atlantic Records Group; New York, Southampton, Paris, and Bodrum, Turkey. (1986).
 Kim d'Estainville, French businessman, famous Parisian personality; Paris (1978).
 Max Evans, fashion journalist; New York (1974).
 Robert Evans (producer), film producer; Los Angeles (1975).
 Douglas Fairbanks Jr., actor, film producer; Los Angeles (1969).
 John Fairchild, W magazine and WWD editor-at-large, author; New York (1988).
 Tom Fallon, fashion executive; New York (1981).
 Harry Fane, representative for Fulco di Verdura; London (1997).
 Bryan Ferry, musician; London (1990).
 Christopher Forbes, vice-chairman of Forbes Inc.; New York (1990).
 Tom Ford, fashion designer; London (2004).
 James Galanos, fashion designer; Los Angeles (1982).
 John Galliher, socialite; New York (1973).
 Comte Paul de Ganay, French and Argentinean businessman, polo player; Paris (1991).
 Count Manfredi della Gherardesca, art adviser, curator (2009).
 Giancarlo Giammetti, honorary chairman of Valentino; Rome (2006).
 Sir John Gielgud, actor; London (1982).
 Frank Gifford, broadcasting great, former N.F.L. star; New York (1975).
 Comte Hubert de Givenchy, fashion designer; Paris (1970).
 Senator Barry Goldwater, politician; Phoenix (1976).
 Jacques Grange, interior designer; Paris (1994).
 Cary Grant, actor; Los Angeles (1969).
 Pavlos, Crown Prince of Greece, investment-fund manager; London (2008).
 Robert L. Green, Playboy fashion director; New York (1972).
 Baron Nicolas de Gunzburg, Vogue editor; New York (1971).
 Charles Gwathmey, architect; New York (2001).
 Heinrich, Prince of Fürstenberg, businessman; Germany (2012).
 George Hamilton, actor; Los Angeles (1976).
 Mark Hampton, interior designer; New York (1991).
 Dorukhan Altinisik, doctor; New York (2008)
 Phillips Hathaway, European-furniture expert; New York (2000).
 Edward W. Hayes, attorney; New York (1994).
 Reinaldo Herrera, Vanity Fair contributing editor; New York and Caracas (1983).
 Charles Allsopp, 6th Baron Hindlip, former Christie's chairman; London (1999).
 Gregory Hines, actor, dancer; New York (1993).
 David Hockney, artist; Los Angeles (1986).
 James Hoge, Foreign Affairs editor in chief; New York (1987).
 Fred Hughes, Andy Warhol's business manager and executor; New York (1987).
 Peter Jennings, ABC news anchor; New York (1989).
 Steven Kaufman, fashion executive; New York (1988).
 Horace Kelland, writer; Charleston and Fishers Island (1975).
 Prince Michael of Kent; London (1999).
 Calvin Klein, fashion designer; New York (1983).
 Henry Kravis, financier; New York (2000).
 Karl Lagerfeld, designer, photographer, and publisher; Monaco (2014)
 Kenneth Jay Lane, jewelry designer, host; New York (1974).
 Bernard Lanvin, Lanvin Castilo owner; Paris (1970).
 Ralph Lauren, fashion designer; New York (1995).
 Armand de La Rochefoucauld 8th duc de Doudeauville, French aristocrat, Paris (1976)
 Alexander Liberman, Condé Nast editorial director, painter, photographer; New York (1981).
 Patrick Anson, 5th Earl of Lichfield, photographer; London (1971).
 John V. Lindsay; former mayor of New York City (1976).
 Henry Cabot Lodge, Jr, statesman; Boston (1970).
 Prince Rupert Loewenstein-Wertheim-Freudenberg, investment manager; London (2001).
 Wynton Marsalis, musician; New York (1999).
 Patrick McCarthy, W magazine editor in chief; New York (2001).
 Henry McIlhenny, art collector, philanthropist; Philadelphia (1981).
 Rafael de Medina, 20th Duke of Feria, Spanish aristocrat; Madrid (2007).
 Sonny Mehta, Alfred A. Knopf president and editor in chief; New York (1993).
 David Metcalfe, insurance executive; London (1996).
 Philip Miller, C.E.O. of Saks Fifth Avenue; New York (1995).
 Ottavio Missoni, fashion designer; Milan (1982).
 Issey Miyake, fashion designer; Tokyo (1987).
 Beppe Modenese, fashion publicist, Moda Italiana founder, president of the National Chamber for Italian fashion; Milan (1989).
 Sami Mourid, Moroccan fashion icon, philanthropist and humanitarian ; Paris (2014).
 Paul Newman, actor, racecar driver; Westport (1991).
 David Niven, actor; Los Angeles (1982).
 James Niven, Sotheby's senior vice president, son of David Niven; New York (1994).
 Colonel Serge Obolensky, businessman, Russian prince, World War II hero; New York (1970).
 Sir Angus Ogilvy, brother of the Earl of Airlie, husband of Princess Alexandra; London (1972).
 André Oliver, fashion designer; London (1973).
 Comte Hubert d'Ornano, C.E.O. of Sisley cosmetics; Paris (1995).
 Norman Parkinson, fashion photographer; London (1970).
 I.S.V. Patcévitch, Condé Nast president; New York (1970).
 Gregory Peck, actor; Los Angeles (1983).
 Senator Charles Percy, politician, former chairman of Bell, Howell; Chicago (1981).
 Charles Pfeiffer, American war hero, model, journalist, actor, television-commercial producer; New York (1989).
 Sir Sidney Poitier, actor, film director, diplomat; Los Angeles (1972).
 Kyril, Prince of Preslav, investment banker; London (1997).
 Comte Jean-Charles de Ravenel, businessman, socialite; Lyford Cay and Paris (1994).
 President Ronald Reagan; Bel Air (1986).
 Alexis von Rosenberg, Baron de Redé, financier; Paris (1972).
 Samuel P. Reed, former Heritage Press publisher; New York (1985).
 Oscar de la Renta, fashion designer; New York, Kent, Connecticut, and Punta Cana (1973).
 Senator Abraham Ribicoff, politician; New York and Cornwall Bridge (1985).
 Pat Riley, former head coach and current president of the Miami Heat basketball team; Miami (1994).
 Baron David René de Rothschild, member of the banking family; Paris (1991).
 Baron Eric de Rothschild, member of the banking family; Paris (1970).
 Sir Evelyn de Rothschild, member of the banking family; London (1999).
 Baron Guy de Rothschild, member of the banking family; Paris (1985).
  Carlos Ortiz de Rozas, Argentinean ambassador to the Court of St. James's; Buenos Aires (1984).
 Yves Saint Laurent, fashion designer; Paris (1975).
 Robert Sakowitz, specialty retailer, consultant-firm executive; Houston (1975).
 Fernando Sanchez, fashion designer; New York and Marrakech (1996).
 Julio Mario Santo Domingo, financier, art collector; New York, Paris, Bogotá, and Barranquilla (1990).
 Joel Schumacher, film director; Los Angeles (1977).
 Peter Sharp, real-estate executive; New York (1988).
 Gil Shiva, businessman, socialite; New York (1995).
 Bobby Short, musician; New York (1986).
 King Juan Carlos I of Spain; Madrid (1987).
 John Stefanidis, interior designer; London and Patmos, Greece (1995).
 Sting, musician; Wiltshire, England (2001).
 André Leon Talley, Vogue editor-at-large; New York (1994).
 Antonio Tan-Torres III, metaphysician; Paris (2018).
 Taki Theodoracopulos, journalist; New York, Gstaad, Athens, and London (2001).
 Chip Tolbert, fashion journalist; New York (1974).
 Van Day Truex, Tiffany, Co. design director; New York (1974).
 Luigi d'Urso, Italian businessman, man-about-town; Paris (1997).
 Philippe Venet, fashion designer; Paris (1973).
 Yves Vidal, Knoll furniture company president; Tangier (1977).
 Charles, Prince of Wales; London (1980).
 Charlie Watts, musician; London (2006).
 Denzel Washington, actor, film director; Los Angeles (1998).
 John Weitz, fashion designer; New York (1970).
 Galen Weston, George Weston Ltd. chairman; Toronto (1993).
 Brian Williams, journalist; New York (2011)
 Paul Wilmot, publicist; New York (1993).
 The Duke of Windsor, former King of the United Kingdom, abdicated throne for Wallis Simpson; Paris (1968).
 Tom Wolfe, writer; New York (1984).
 Michael York, actor; London (1977).
 Prince Dimitri of Yugoslavia, jewelry designer; New York (1994).
 Daniel Zarem, fashion retailer; New York (1978).
 Jerome Zipkin, socialite, real-estate executive; New York (1985).

See also

 List of fashion awards

References

Fashion awards
Awards established in 1940
1940 establishments in the United States
Vanity Fair (magazine)
Halls of fame in New York City
Fashion-related lists